Likhi Range or Surami Range is a mountain range in Georgia, a part of the Caucasus mountains. It connects the Greater Caucasus and Lesser Caucasus ranges and  belongs to the Dzirulula denudative Plateau. It is watershed of the Black and Caspian seas basins and divides the country climatically and geomorphologically.

A railroad (in the tunnel) runs through the pass, as well as the Zestaponi-Khashuri highway. A southern portion of the Likhi range was historically known as Ghado.

See also 
 Rikoti Pass
Meskheti Range

References 

Mountain ranges of the Caucasus
Mountain ranges of Georgia (country)
Drainage divides